Midwestern Collegiate Hockey Conference (MWCHC) is an American Collegiate Hockey Association Division III club level hockey-only college athletic conference with teams in the American Midwest.

Members
Butler University
Denison University
Eastern Kentucky
Holy Cross College
Indiana University-Purdue University Fort Wayne
University of Akron
University of Louisville
Xavier University

See also
American Collegiate Hockey Association
List of ice hockey leagues

References

ACHA Division 3 conferences